Luis Fernando Jaramillo Correa (24 July 1935 – 23 November 2011) worked for Goldman Sachs International as an international advisor. He also served on the boards of directors of Interbolsa, S.A., Gerdau-Dicao, S.A. and Trident Gold SAS.

His distinguished political career in Colombia included terms as vice president, Minister of Public Works and Transport, minister for economic development, minister of mining and energy, Minister of Foreign Affairs, and minister of the interior. He also served as the 22nd Permanent Representative of Colombia to the United Nations, in New York.

Jaramillo earned a civil engineering degree from National University of Colombia in Medellin and also studied at the London School of Economics.

Personal life
He was born on 24 July 1935 in Barranquilla, the first-born son of Mario Jaramillo Echaverria and Helvia Correa Mejía. In 1966, he married Gladys Corredor Morales in Bogotá, and together they had three children: Luis, Mario, and Mónica.

He died on 23 November 2011 in Bogota.

References

1935 births
2011 deaths
Colombian Liberal Party politicians
Foreign ministers of Colombia
Presidential Designates of Colombia
Permanent Representatives of Colombia to the United Nations
20th-century Colombian businesspeople
Colombian civil engineers
National University of Colombia alumni
People from Barranquilla